The 2021 AFC Champions League knockout stage was played from 13 September to 23 November 2021. A total of 16 teams competed in the knockout stage to decide the champions of the 2021 AFC Champions League.

Qualified teams
The group winners and three best-runners up in the group stage from each region advanced to the round of 16, with both West Region (Groups A–E) and East Region (Groups F–J) having eight qualified teams.

Combination table
If two group winners played each other, the group winner marked with * hosted the match.

West Region

One-leg matches (13–14 September 2021)

East Region

One-leg matches (14–15 September 2021)

Format

In the knockout stage, the 16 teams played a single-elimination tournament, with the teams split into the two regions until the final. All ties were played as a single-leg match (Regulations Article 9.1). Extra time and penalty shoot-out were used to decide the winners if necessary (Regulations Article 9.3 and 10.1).

Schedule
The schedule of each round was as follows.

Bracket
The bracket of the knockout stage was determined as follows:

Round of 16

Summary

The round of 16 was played over one leg, with the matchups determined by the combination tables based on which group runners-up qualified.

|+West Region

|}

|+East Region

|}

West Region

East Region

Quarter-finals

Summary

The quarter-finals were played over one leg, with the matchups and home team decided by draw held on 17 September at 15:00 (UTC+8) in Kuala Lumpur, Malaysia.

|+West Region

{{OneLegResult|Persepolis|IRI|0–3|Al-Hilal|KSA}}
|}

|+East Region

|}

West Region

East Region

Semi-finals

Summary

The semi-finals were played over one leg.

|+West Region

|}

|+East Region

|}

West Region

East Region

Final

The final was played over a single leg on 23 November. The host was determined on a rotational basis, with the match hosted by team from the West Region in odd-numbered years (Regulations 9.1.2).

Notes

References

External links
, the-AFC.com
AFC Champions League 2021, stats.the-AFC.com

3
September 2021 sports events in Asia
October 2021 sports events in Asia
November 2021 sports events in Asia